Sir Alan Frederick "Tommy" Lascelles,  (11 April 1887 – 10 August 1981) was a British courtier and civil servant who held several positions in the first half of the twentieth century, culminating in his position as Private Secretary to both King George VI and Queen Elizabeth II. In 1950, he wrote the Lascelles Principles in a letter to the editor of The Times, using the pen-name "Senex".

Early life and education
Lascelles was born on 11 April 1887 in the village of Sutton Waldron in Dorset, England, the sixth and youngest child and only surviving son of Commander Frederick Canning Lascelles and Frederica Maria Liddell, and the grandson of Henry Lascelles, 4th Earl of Harewood. He was thus a cousin of Henry Lascelles, 6th Earl of Harewood, who married Mary, Princess Royal, sister of his employers, Edward VIII and George VI. His mother was the daughter of Sir Adolphus Liddell, son of Thomas Liddell, 1st Baron Ravensworth.

After attending Marlborough College, followed by Trinity College, Oxford, Lascelles served in France with the Bedfordshire Yeomanry during the First World War, where he rose to the rank of captain and was awarded the Military Cross, after which he became aide-de-camp to his brother-in-law Lord Lloyd, the Governor of Bombay from 1919 to 1920.

Career
Lascelles then returned to Britain and was appointed Assistant Private Secretary to Edward, Prince of Wales, in 1920, serving in that role until resigning in 1929, citing differences with the prince. From 1931 to 1935, he was Secretary to the Governor General of Canada, Vere Ponsonby, 9th Earl of Bessborough.

Lascelles became the Assistant Private Secretary to George V in the latter months of 1935.

When the Prince of Wales ascended the throne as Edward VIII on the death of George V in January 1936, Lascelles served briefly as the new King's assistant private secretary. Then, when Edward VIII abdicated in December 1936, Lascelles became assistant private secretary to George VI, some time after the new king's accession.

Lascelles was knighted by George VI, while aboard a train, during the moderately successful 1939 royal tour of Canada and the United States, which he had helped to arrange and manage; the King made him a Knight Commander of the Royal Victorian Order (KCVO) which is an honour in the personal gift of the sovereign and does not require political approval. He had been appointed a Companion of the Order of the Bath in 1937, was promoted to Knight Commander of the Order of the Bath in 1944 and to Knight Grand Cross on his retirement in 1953. He had been appointed a Member of the Royal Victorian Order in 1926, before his promotion to Knighthood in that Order in 1939. He was made a Companion of the Order of St Michael and St George in 1933. He was sworn of the Privy Council, entitling him to the prefix "Right Honourable", in 1943.

In 1943, Lascelles was promoted to Private Secretary to George VI. In 1952 he became Private Secretary to Elizabeth II, a role he held until 1953.

Lascelles was also Keeper of the Royal Archives from 1943 to 1953.

He retired from his 27 years of royal service on the last day of 1953, at the age of 66. He had been asked by then Prime Minister Sir Winston Churchill twice and by the Queen once whether he would like to go to the House of Lords with a hereditary peerage but he declined. He did, however, accept appointment as a Knight Grand Cross of the Order of the Bath which, he said, "rated much higher than a peerage".

Lascelles's papers are now held in the Churchill Archives Centre at Churchill College, Cambridge.

Personal life
On 16 March 1920, Lascelles married Joan Frances Vere Thesiger (1895–1971), daughter of Frederic Thesiger, 1st Viscount Chelmsford, a former Viceroy of India and First Lord of the Admiralty.

They had three children:
John Frederick Lascelles, born 11 June 1922, died 11 September 1951.
Lavinia Joan Lascelles, born 27 June 1923, died 3 November 2020; married to Major Edward Westland Renton, divorced 1960, then 1962–64 to the writer Gavin Maxwell, and to David Hankinson in 1969.
Caroline Mary Lascelles, born 15 February 1927; married 1949 to Antony Lyttelton, 2nd Viscount Chandos; then 1985 to David Erskine, son of Lord Erskine.

Lascelles died on 10 August 1981 at Kensington Palace at the age of 94.

Honours and awards

 He also received the Royal Household Long and Faithful Service Medal.

In popular culture
Lascelles is portrayed by Paul Brooke in the 2002 film Bertie and Elizabeth and Pip Torrens in the 2016 Netflix series The Crown.

Bibliography

References

Sources

 
Lascelles, Rt. Hon. Sir Alan Frederick, (11 April 1887–10 Aug. 1981), Past Director: The Midland Bank; Royal Academy of Music; Private Secretary to the Queen, 1952–53; Keeper of the Queen’s Archives, 1952–53 (of the King’s Archives, 1943–52), doi.org/10.1093/ww/9780199540884.013.U166201 Who's Who

External links
The Papers of Sir Alan Lascelles at the Churchill Archives Centre

1887 births
1981 deaths
Military personnel from Dorset
Knights Commander of the Order of the Bath
Companions of the Order of St Michael and St George
Knights Grand Cross of the Royal Victorian Order
Recipients of the Military Cross
People educated at Marlborough College
Alumni of Trinity College, Oxford
British Army personnel of World War I
Private Secretaries to the Sovereign
Assistant Private Secretaries to the Sovereign
Alan
Bedfordshire Yeomanry officers
Members of the Privy Council of the United Kingdom